Ari Hoenig (born November 13, 1973) is an American jazz drummer, composer, and educator.

Educational materials
Hoenig has taught and is on the faculty at New York University and The New School in New York. He gives clinics and lectures at music schools and universities worldwide.

With bassist Johannes Weidenmueller, he released Intro to Polyrhythms Vol 1, and Metric Modulations, Expanding and Contracting Time within Form Vol 2. (Mel Bay 2009, 2012) In 2011, he released Systems Book 1, Drumming Technique and Melodic Jazz Independence (Alfred Publishing) and the DVD Melodic Drumming (2011). In 2014, Ari he released the video Rhythm Training about time and rhythmic vocabulary. In 2017, he released two videos: Mastering Odd Times and Drums: Jazz Coordination.

Awards
In 2013 Hoenig won the BMW Welt (World) award in Munich, an international competition for best band led by a drummer.

Discography

As leader
 Time Travels (1999)
 The Life of a Day (Ah Ha, 2002)
 The Painter (Smalls, 2004)
 Inversations (Dreyfus, 2006)
 Bert's Playground (Dreyfus, 2008)
 Punkbop: Live at Smalls (Smallslive, 2010)
 Lines of Oppression (Naïve, 2012)
 The Pauper and the Magician (Ah Ha, 2016)
 NY Standard (Fresh Sound, 2018)
 Conner's Days (Fresh Sound, 2019)
 Live (2021)

As sideman
With Richard Bona
 Scenes from My Life (Columbia, 1999)
 Reverence (Columbia, 2001)
 Tiki (EmArcy, 2005)

With Jean-Michel Pilc
 Together Live at Sweet Basil (A Records, 2000)
 Welcome Home (Dreyfus, 2002)
 Cardinal Points (Dreyfus, 2003)
 New Dreams (Dreyfus, 2007)
 Threedom (Motema, 2011)

With Kenny Werner
 Beauty Secrets (RCA Victor, 1999)
 Form and Fantasy (Double-Time, 2001)
 Beat Degeneration Live Vol. 2 (Night Bird Music, 2002)
 Peace: Live at the Blue Note (Half Note, 2004)
 With a Song in My Heart (Venus, 2008)
 The Melody (Pirouet, 2015)
 Animal Crackers (Pirouet, 2017)

With others
 Quentin Angus, In Stride (QFTF, 2017)
 Diego Barber, 411 (Origin, 2013)
 Bojan Z, Xenophonia (Label Bleu, 2006)
 Bill Carrothers, Keep Your Sunny Side Up (Pirouet, 2007)
 Orlando le Fleming, Orlando le Fleming & Romantic Funk (OLF, 2017)
 Macy Gray, Stripped (Chesky, 2016)
 Tigran Hamasyan, World Passion (Plus Loin Music, 2009)
 Gilad Hekselman, Splitlife (Smalls, 2006)
 Antoine Herve, Road Movie (Nocturne, 2006)
 James Hurt, Dark Grooves, Mystical Rhythms (Blue Note, 1999)
 Jazz Mandolin Project, Xenoblast (Blue Note, 2000)
 Julien Lourau, The Rise (Label Bleu, 2001)
 Shahin Novrasli, Bayati (Bee Jazz, 2013)
 Jamie Oehlers, Smoke and Mirrors (Jazzheads, 2012)
 Josh Roseman, Cherry (Enja, 2000)
 Jacques Schwarz-Bart, Immersion (Fresh Sound, 1999)
 J. D. Walter, 2Bass, a Face and a Little Skin (Dreambox, 2004)
 J. D. Walter, Clear Day (Double-Time, 2001)
 Sam Yahel, Jazz Side of the Moon (Chesky, 2008)

References

External links
 
 [ Biography at AllMusic]
 [ Review of The Painter at AllMusic]
  Drummerworld feature
  All About Jazz feature
  Article at Los Angeles Times, 2005
  Article at Down Beat, 2006

1973 births
Living people
American jazz drummers
Musicians from Philadelphia
University of North Texas College of Music alumni
Chesky Records artists
20th-century American drummers
American male drummers
Jazz musicians from Pennsylvania
21st-century American drummers
20th-century American male musicians
21st-century American male musicians
American male jazz musicians